Xavier Numia (born 29 November 1998 in New Zealand) is a New Zealand rugby union player who plays for the  in Super Rugby. His playing position is prop. He was named in the Hurricanes squad for week 1 in 2019.

Reference list

External links
itsrugby.co.uk profile

1998 births
New Zealand sportspeople of Samoan descent
New Zealand rugby union players
Rugby union props
Living people
Wellington rugby union players
Hurricanes (rugby union) players
Rugby union players from Wellington City